Alfred or Alf Ward may refer to: 

 Alfred Dudley Ward (1905–1991), British Army officer, Governor of Gibraltar
 Alfred G. Ward (1908–1982), U.S. Navy admiral
 Alf Ward (1885–1926), English footballer